Overvaal Stereo is a South African community radio station based in the Free State.

Coverage areas 
Potchefstroom
Klerksdorp
Odendaalsrus
Coligny
Welkom
Kroonstad
Virginia
Parys
Vanderbijlpark
Sasolburg

Broadcast languages
Predominantly Afrikaans
With some English

Broadcast time
24/7 (Monday - Sunday)

Target audience
Afrikaans-speaking communities
LSM Groups 6 - 10
Age Group 25 - 49

Programme format
40% Talk
60% Music

Listenership Figures

References

External links
 Official Website
 SAARF Website

Community radio stations in South Africa
Mass media in the Free State (province)